Simala is a comune (municipality) in the Province of Oristano in the Italian region Sardinia, located about  northwest of Cagliari and about  southeast of Oristano.

Simala borders the following municipalities: Baressa, Curcuris, Gonnoscodina, Gonnosnò, Masullas, Pompu.

References

Cities and towns in Sardinia